Darío Espina Pérez (October 25, 1920 – September 6, 1996) was a Cuban banker, agricultural engineer, lawyer, writer, and the founder and president of La Academia Poética de Miami, a literary society established in 1989.

Biography
Pérez was born in Limonar, Matanzas, Cuba, on October 25, 1920, to a family dedicated to beekeeping, Espina went on to author nearly forty technical and literary books and to co-author several more, all edited in collaboration with his wife, Hilda Díaz Espina. His writing received a number of awards, including the Premio Garcilaso de la Vega in 1995, given by the Instituto de Cultura Peruana for his poem La Naturaleza. In 1995 Espina was recognized as the teacher of the decade by the Cuadratura del Círculo Poético Iberoamericano in commemoration of the 100th anniversary of the death of José Martí.

He received his elementary education in public schools and through exams received a scholarship from the Ministry of Agriculture to study to become an agricultural sciences teacher in the Álvaro Reynoso Principal Agricultural School in Colón, Cuba. After earning a bachelor of science degree, he attended the Faculty of Agricultural Engineering at the University of Havana, where he graduated with the degree of Agricultural Engineer in Sugar Chemistry. He later returned to the University of Havana to earn his law degree.

Espina's activities in Cuba were centered on the banking and agriculture industries. He was part of the accounting department at the Banco Continental Cubano, chief of construction for the Public Works Ministry's "Via Blanca" project, a math professor at the Álvaro Reynoso Provincial Agricultural School, and an inspector at the Provincial Schools of Agriculture; he also held various posts at the Banco de Fomento Agricola e Industrial, was consultant and deputy administrator at the Banco Núñez in Havana, manager of a branch of the Banco de la Construcción, professor and Dean of the Faculty of Agricultural Engineers of the University of Havana, professor in the Faculty of Law of the University of Pinar del Río, chief of the appraisal department at the National Institute of Agrarian Reform in 1959, and, finally, officer of the Banco Nacional de Cuba until he left Cuba in 1961 during a scientific congress in Spain.

In 1961, Espina was granted asylum in the United States. Outside of Cuba, Espina continued to be an active professional through his position beginning in 1962 as sector specialist, consultant, and project manager with the Interamerican Development Bank (IDB) in Washington, D.C. Espina worked and lived in various countries in Latin America, including Honduras, the Dominican Republic, Venezuela, Ecuador, Haiti, and Costa Rica.

In 1981, Espina retired from the IDB and settled in Miami, Florida, with his wife, lawyer Hilda Díaz Espina, and their three children, physicians Hilda Tejero and Darío M. Espina and management and information technology specialist Carlos Espina. He died in Miami on September 6, 1996.

Works or publications

Awards and recognitions

Notes and references

Further reading

External links

 The Darío Espina Pérez papers are available at the Cuban Heritage Collection, University of Miami Libraries. This archival collection documents the professional activities of Darío Espina Pérez in his capacity as poet, lawyer, agricultural engineer, historian, literary critic, and founder and president of La Academia Poética de Miami.

1920 births
1996 deaths
Cuban emigrants to the United States
Cuban exiles
Cuban male writers
20th-century Cuban lawyers
Exiles of the Cuban Revolution in the United States